The Blasphemer is a 1921 American silent drama film directed by O. E. Goebel and starring George Howard and Augusta Anderson. It was produced by the Catholic Art Association.

Plot
The story revolves around John Harden, a Wall Street banker whose absence in faith leads to a life of despair and poverty. Having risen to a position of power on Wall Street, he boasts about his successes, claiming that he is the master of his fate, not God nor the devil. Soon afterwards, though, his family goes into poverty and his friends leave him. His faith is restored when he rescues his daughter who was being kept hostage in a Chinese opium den.

Cast
George Howard - John Harden
Augusta Anderson - Mrs. Anderson
Irving Cummings - Chinese Opium Den Operator

References

External links
 

1921 films
1921 drama films
American silent feature films
American black-and-white films
Silent American drama films
1920s American films